"Kill Straker!" is the seventh episode aired of the first series of UFO - a 1970 British television science fiction series about an alien invasion of Earth. The screenplay was written Donald James and the director was 
Alan Perry. The episode was filmed between 5 November and 17 November 1969 and aired on the ATV Midlands on 4 November 1970. Though shown as the seventh episode, it was actually the sixteenth to have been filmed. The episode was originally titled The Inside Man.

The series was created by Gerry Anderson and Sylvia Anderson with Reg Hill, and produced by the Andersons and Lew Grade's Century 21 Productions for Grade's ITC Entertainment company.

Story
Col. Paul Foster and Captain Frank Craig are piloting a lunar module when it is approached by a UFO. Both are then subjected to mind-altering impulses that cause them to want to kill Commander Edward Straker. Straker makes a split-second decision that saves the men from crashing.

Returning to Moonbase Alpha, Foster starts to criticise Straker's performance and then Craig makes an unsuccessful attempt to kill Straker in his sleep. Craig also tries to destroy Moonbase's supply of air and water but is killed in the attempt. To further discredit Straker's abilities, Foster sends a critical report on him to General James L. Henderson, leading to a confrontation between Straker and Foster. Foster pulls a gun, a bullet punctures Moonbase's sphere and the two pass out from lack of oxygen.

Now back on Earth, Foster is placed under hypnosis by Dr.Jackson which reveals that the aliens mentally implanted the impulse to kill Straker. Although Foster's career with SHADO appears over, Straker is not willing to give up on him and decides to test if Foster can combat the urge. He puts himself and Foster in a sealed room and tries to convince Foster that he is going to kill him. Foster demonstrates that he can overcome the urge to kill Straker; soon after he is returned to active duty.

Cast

Starring
 Ed Bishop — Col. Edward "Ed" Straker, Commander-in-chief of SHADO
 Michael Billington — Col. Paul Foster
 Grant Taylor — Gen. James L. Henderson, President of IAC
 George Sewell — Col. Alec E. Freeman, Second-in-command of SHADO
 Harry Baird — Lt. Mark Bradley
 Gabrielle Drake — Lt. Gay Ellis
 Dolores Mantez — Lt. Nina Barry
 Keith Alexander — Lt. Keith Ford
 Ayshea — Lt. Ayshea Johnson
 Vladek Sheybal — Dr. Douglas Jackson

Featuring
 David Sumner — Captain Frank Craig	
 Steve Cory — Moonbase guard	
 Louise Pajo — Nurse

Production notes
Locations included Neptune House at ATV Elstree Studios, Borehamwood; and MGM-British Studios, Borehamwood.

References

External links

1970 British television episodes
UFO (TV series) episodes